Kyphosus is a genus of sea chubs native to the Atlantic, Indian and Pacific oceans. It is the only genus in the subfamily Kyphosinae of the family Kyphosidae.

Species
There are currently 16 recognized species in this genus:
 Kyphosus analogus (T. N. Gill, 1862) (Blue-bronze sea chub)
 Kyphosus atlanticus K. Sakai & Nakabo, 2014 (Caribbean sea chub)
 Kyphosus azureus (O. P. Jenkins & Evermann, 1889) (Zebra-perch sea chub)
 Kyphosus bigibbus Lacépède, 1801 (Brown chub)
 Kyphosus bosquii (Lacépède, 1802) (Bermuda sea chub)
 Kyphosus cinerascens (Forsskål, 1775) (Blue sea chub)
 Kyphosus cornelii (Whitley, 1944) (Western buffalo bream)
 Kyphosus elegans (W. K. H. Peters, 1869) (Cortez sea chub)
 Kyphosus gladius Knudsen & Clements, 2013 (Gladius sea chub)
 Kyphosus hawaiiensis K. Sakai & Nakabo, 2004 (Hawaiian chub)
 Kyphosus incisor (G. Cuvier, 1831) (Yellow sea chub)
 Kyphosus ocyurus (D. S. Jordan & C. H. Gilbert, 1882) (Blue-striped chub)
 Kyphosus pacificus K. Sakai & Nakabo, 2004 (Pacific chub)
 Kyphosus sectatrix (Linnaeus, 1766) (Bermuda chub)
 Kyphosus sydneyanus (Günther, 1886) (Silver drummer)
 Kyphosus vaigiensis (Quoy & Gaimard, 1825) (Brassy chub)

Some of the above species have now been synonymised with others within the genus; K. analogus and K. incisor with K. viagiensis, K. atlanticus and K. pacificus with K. sectatrix while K. bosquii is synonymised with K. bigibbus.

Catalog of Fishes recognises the following 12 species:

References

 
Kyphosidae
Taxa named by Bernard Germain de Lacépède